Chalybosoma is a genus of horse flies in the family Tabanidae.

Species
Chalybosoma luciliaeforme (Schuurmans Stekhoven, 1926)
Chalybosoma malkini Oldroyd, 1949
Chalybosoma metallicum (Ricardo, 1913)

References

Tabanidae
Diptera of Australasia
Taxa named by Harold Oldroyd
Brachycera genera